Macrosoma leucoplethes is a moth-like butterfly in the family Hedylidae. It was described by Louis Beethoven Prout in 1917.

References

Hedylidae
Butterflies described in 1917